Henri de Saint Germain (30 June 1878 – 19 December 1951) was a French fencer. He won a silver medal in the team sabre competition at the 1920 Summer Olympics.

References

External links
 

1878 births
1951 deaths
French male sabre fencers
Olympic fencers of France
Fencers at the 1920 Summer Olympics
Fencers at the 1924 Summer Olympics
Olympic silver medalists for France
Olympic medalists in fencing
Medalists at the 1920 Summer Olympics